West Greene High School is a public High School located six miles west of Waynesburg, the county seat of Greene County, Pennsylvania. There are about 300 students in grades 9-12. The school building is attached to the school's sole feeder, West Greene Middle School.

Vocational education
Students in grades 10–12 have the opportunity to attend the Greene County Career and Technology Center, located in Franklin Township part-time while attending their home school, in learning a certain trade.

Athletics
West Greene is a member of both the Pennsylvania Interscholastic Athletic Association and the Western Pennsylvania Interscholastic Athletic League (PIAA District VII)

References

Public high schools in Pennsylvania
Schools in Greene County, Pennsylvania